= Littleton Cricket Club =

American cricket club

Littleton Cricket Club is one of eight teams which make up the Colorado Cricket League. It is based in Littleton, Colorado. The club was founded by Dan Ruparel in 1994, and plays its home matches at Cornerstone Park. The park's synthetic pitch was the first permanent cricket pitch in the Greater Denver area.

Littleton is arguably the CCL's most successful club, having won the League's Twenty20 championship six times (in 2008, 2009, 2012, 2013, 2014, and 2016) and its Premier League four times (in 2012, 2013, 2014, and 2016).

The team is mainly based around expatriate players from the Indian subcontinent, but also includes players from other major cricket playing nations and Americans.
